Chup: Revenge of the Artist is a 2022 Indian Hindi-language crime thriller film written and directed by R. Balki. The film is produced by Rakesh Jhunjhunwala, Jayantilal Gada, Gauri Shinde, and Anil Naidu, under Hope Production. The film stars Sunny Deol, Dulquer Salmaan and Shreya Dhanwanthary, while Pooja Bhatt and Saranya Ponvannan essay supporting roles.

In Mumbai, a serial killer targets film critics who give dishonest reviews for films, and IG Arvind Mathur is assigned to catch the killer. Chup: Revenge of the Artist was released on 23 September 2022.

It is an unofficial adaptation of the British film Theatre of Blood.

Plot
In Mumbai, a film critic named Nitin Srivatsav is found dead at his residence, where IG Arvind Mathur is assigned to investigate the case. Arvind deduces that the killer mutilated Nitin's body with a surgical knife and drew a symbol on his forehead, which he is unable to decipher.

Danny is a florist who meets Nila Menon, an entertainment reporter, and the two fall for each other. Few days later, another film critic Irshaad Ali is also found dead with his body being crushed under a train. Meanwhile, Danny and Nila grow close. Danny surprises her on her birthday, which happens to fall on the same day as the death anniversary of famous actor and director Guru Dutt. He gifts her "Kaagaz Ke Phool" (Flowers made of paper). After a week, another film critic Parikshit Prabhu is found dead in a cricket stadium with his body parts and organs removed and scattered around. Arvind deduces that the killer reads the reviews written by the critics and targets only those who give negative reviews to films.

Arvind summons all major film critics in Mumbai and ask them to cooperate in their investigation, but they refuse, fearing for their lives. The next day, another critic Govind Pandey is found dead and it is revealed (to the audience) that the killer was none other than Danny. Pandey had given a positive review to a mediocre film, as the film's makers had paid him money to do so. Danny brutally killed him, mutilating his body and painting the walls with his blood. After this, Arvind is provided a two-week deadline to solve the case, where he takes the help of a criminal psychologist, Zenobia Shroff. Zenobia suggests that the killer might have a connection with the film industry.

Arvind soon checks the list of film directors, who retired after their films were panned by film critics and tanked at the box office, where they learn about Guru Dutt, whose last film Kaagaz Ke Phool was panned by critics. Realizing that the killer is connected to Guru Dutt, Arvind decides to catch him by asking some critics to post their reviews in the same way like the previous critics, but they all refuse. Nila is asked to review a newly released film, to which she reluctantly agrees. Later, Danny reads Nila's review and, finding it dishonest and uninformed, gets enraged. He kidnaps and tries to kill Nila, but Arvind saves her and arrests Danny.

Later, the police finds a cassette named Chup and finds that the film is actually Danny's biopic. Danny's real name was Sebastian Gomes, and he was a fan of Guru Dutt since childhood. Sebastian's father used to physically abuse his mother and had killed his dog, also named Danny. Having grown up, Sebastian punished his father, by locking him inside the room, killing him, and later, his mother died as well. After this, Sebastian wrote and directed the film Chup, which was panned by critics, which led Sebastian to become mentally scarred and he becomes a serial killer, punishing the critics who give dishonest reviews to films. Chup later gets recognition and is regarded as a masterpiece just like Kaagaz Ke Phool.

Cast

Sunny Deol as Inspector General Of Police Officer Arvind Mathur, head of crime branch, Mumbai
Dulquer Salmaan as "Danny" (Sebastian Gomes), a florist
Shreya Dhanwanthary as Nila Menon, an entertainment reporter
Saranya Ponvannan as Nila's mother
Pooja Bhatt as Dr. Zenobia Shroff, a criminal psychologist and a leading member of SSSP
 Amitabh Bachchan as himself 
 Rajeev Ravindranathan as Deputy Superintendent Of Police Officer Srinivas Shetty
 Adhyayan Suman as Purab Kapoor 
 Raja Sen as Senior Critic
 Dhruv Hiena Lohumi as Kartik 
 Bipin Nadakarni as Commissioner, DGP of Crime Branch, Mumbai
 Zahir Mirza as Nikhil
 Rea Malhotra Mukhtyar as Richa
 Pravishi Das as Reshma
 Priyanka Karekar as Danny's mother
 Pyarali Nayani as Nitin Srivastav, a critic
 Veenu Khatri as Nitin Srivastav's wife
 Dhanesh Dogra as Parikshit Prabhu
 Amit Chakravarthy as Irshaad Ali
 Nilesh Ranade as Govind Pandey
 Chandrakant Parulekar as Kaleem Bhai
 Abeer Jain as Kinu Malhotra
 Prajakta Parab as the mother featured in the film Chup

Production
In July 2021, R. Balki were confirmed to be directing a film based on Guru Dutt, to be produced again by Hope Production.The project is produced by Rakesh Jhunjhunwala, Jayantilal Gada and Gauri Shinde. 
Filmmaker R. Balki says cinema legend Guru Dutt was the perfect reference point for "Chup: Revenge of the Artist", his thriller which depicts the pain of an artist who suffers from "wrong criticism". A teaser of "Chup", unveiled over the weekend to mark Dutt's 97th birth anniversary, pays homage to the late director's film Kaagaz Ke Phool.

Soundtrack 

The music of the film is composed by 
Amit Trivedi, Sneha Khanwalkar and S. D. Burman with lyrics written by Swanand Kirkire and Sahir Ludhianvi.

Release 
Chup: Revenge of the Artist was released on 23 September 2022. The satellite and streaming rights of the film were bagged by Zee TV and ZEE5. The movie was digitally released on November 25, 2022.

Reception

Critical response

India 
Roktim Rajpal of India Today rated the film 3.5 out of 5 stars and wrote "Chup is a highly watchable and layered thriller that may 'silence' its critics, courtesy of its refreshing concept". Ronak Kotecha of The Times of India rated the film 3 out of 5 stars and wrote "Even though the story maintains the suspense behind the invisible entity until the end, it neither surprises nor shocks when it unfolds. The songs are easily forgettable, though the background music is still okay". Avinash Lohana of Pinkvilla rated the film 3 out of 5 stars and wrote "R Balki's Chup: Revenge of the Artist is a unique film, but is not critic proof". Sukanya Verma of Rediff rated the film 3 out of 5 stars and wrote "Chup's bias is reserved for disgruntled creators at the receiving end of nasty appraisals of their efforts". Bollywood Hungama rated the film 3 out of 5 stars and wrote "CHUP is a unique tale of a serial killer that boasts of some fine performances". Stutee Ghosh of The Quint rated the film 2.5 out of 5 stars and wrote "Chup remains an interesting, intriguing idea that couldn't quite execute what it ambitiously set out to achieve".

Anna M. M. Vetticad of Firstpost rated the film 2.5 out of 5 stars and wrote "Chup's story of a serial killer who targets critics is spun into a tribute to Guru Dutt. The idea is interesting but the film fails to grasp the essence of the late legend's magic". Shubhra Gupta of The Indian Express rated the film 2 out of 5 stars and wrote "This Dulquer Salmaan film, about dream-makers and those who destroy those dreams, is less satisfactory than it should have been". Saibal Chatterjee of NDTV rated the film 2 out of 5 stars and wrote that Chup was "a muddle but certainly not of monumental proportions. That it ventures into uncharted territory is undeniably commendable. But it needed something more to be elevate itself above a mere idiosyncratic concept". Bohni Bandyopadhyay of News 18 rated the film 2 out of 5 stars and wrote "Chup works in parts thanks to the premise and some taut moments of suspense. The rich texture, wonderful use of real locations, and flavourful camerawork help the plot appear more mythic than it actually is".'Chup' is a one-time watchable film that has an intriguing yet crisp storyline, except for a few predictable sequences says Onmanorama.

International 
Phil Houd of The Guardian rated the film 4 out of 5 stars and wrote that "Chup successfully skewers not just the tense film-maker/critic relationship, but knows perfectly where to put its finger to best needle Film Twitter: it calls out hot-take merchants, overly positive and corrupt reviewers, and this exalted calling's self-importance...it's a caustic and tasty film for the most part." Manjusha Radhakrishnan of Gulf News rated the film 3 out of 5 stars and wrote "R Balki shines the spotlight on a dark and twisted mind in his sobering thriller Chup.

Box office
Chup: Revenge of the Artist earned 3.06 crores at the domestic box office on its opening day. On the second day, the film collected 2.07 crore. On the third day, the film collected 2.25 crore. The film collected 20.02 crore at worldwide. The film has earned double of its budget due to which the film has proved to be a hit.

References

External links
 
 Chup: Revenge of the Artist on ZEE5
 Chup at Bollywood Hungama

2022 thriller films
Indian psychological thriller films
2020s Hindi-language films
Indian serial killer films
Films directed by R. Balki
2020s serial killer films
Indian slasher films